The Worcester class was a class of light cruisers used by the United States Navy, laid down in 1945 and commissioned in 1948–49. They and their contemporaries, the  heavy cruisers, were the last all-gun cruisers built for the U.S. Navy. Ten ships were planned for this class, but only two ( and ) were completed.

Aside from the Worcesters' main battery consisting of  rather than  guns, the layout was identical to the much smaller  light cruisers, carrying 12 guns in six turrets, three forward and three aft, with only turrets 3 and 4 superfiring. The 6-inch/47-caliber gun was an autoloading, high-angle dual purpose gun with a high rate of fire, and the Worcesters were thus designed to serve as AA cruisers like the Juneaus but with much more potent guns, as well as conventional light cruisers.

Both ships were decommissioned in 1958, the last conventional light cruisers to serve in the fleet, and scrapped in the early 1970s.

Design 
The Worcester class was designed as a departure from the Cleveland-class and Fargo-class cruisers, and an expansion of the Atlanta and Juneau classes. They carried six twin D.P. 6-inch/47-caliber gun turrets on the center-line, of which turrets three and four were superimposed. They carried 24 3"/50 cal AA in eleven twin mounts and two single mounts. The RDF was superb, as they were supplied with four HA/LA.DCTs and two LA/DCTs arranged in lozenge disposition. Their armor was a 3-6" belt, a 3" main deck, a 2" lower deck, 3-4" bulkheads, 4" turrets and barbettes, and a 6.5" C.T. Four Babcock & Wilcox boilers with four shafts and G.E. geared turbines provided 120,000 S.H.P., which could propel these ships at 32.75 knots.

Ships in class

See also
 CL-154-class cruiser, an abortive contemporary design
 Minotaur-class cruiser (1947), a Royal Navy design similar in concept.
 List of cruisers of the United States Navy

References

External links

Global Security.org - Worcester class cruiser
Global Security.org - Worcester class cruiser specifications

 
New York Shipbuilding Corporation